Steven Edward Browning (born November 30, 1993) is an American professional basketball player for Ovarense Basquetebol of the Liga Portuguesa de Basquetebol. He played college basketball for Fairmont State and Marshall.

Early life and high school
Browning was born in Pensacola, Florida, raised in Logan, West Virginia and attended Logan High School. While at Logan Browning helped lead the Wildcats to the state playoffs three times and to the state title. As a senior he averaged 25.2 points per game and was named first team All-State.

College career

Fairmont State
Browning began his collegiate career at Fairmont State. He appeared in all 32 of the Fighting Falcons' games as a freshman, averaging 6.9 points per game, and led the team in scoring as a sophomore, averaging 16.8 and 5.7 rebounds and was named second team All-MEC (2014). Following his sophomore season, Browning announced that he would be transferring to Marshall University.

Marshall
After sitting out one season due to NCAA transfer rules, Browning played two seasons for Marshall. As a redshirt junior, Browning averaged 12.8 points, 4.5 rebounds and 3.6 assists. In his redshirt senior season, he was the Thundering Herd's second-leading scorer at 16.1 points per game. He was named to the 2017 Conference USA all-tournament team after averaging 19.5 points, 5.8 rebounds and 5.0 assists a game. Browning completed his collegiate career with 1,694 total points scored, 726 at Fairmont State and 968 at Marshall.

Professional career

Trabzonspor B.K.
Browning signed with Trabzonspor B.K. of the Turkish Basketball Super League (BSL) on July 21, 2017. He only appeared in one BSL game and two FIBA Europe Cup games before leaving the team.

Szolnoki Olaj KK
Browning then signed with Szolnoki Olaj KK of the Hungarian Nemzeti Bajnokság I/A (NB I/A). He averaged 9 points, 1.5 assists and 3.1 rebounds in 25 games (8 starts) as Szolnoki won the NB I/A title and the 2018 Hungarian Cup. After the season he played for the West Virginia Wildcats in The Basketball tournament.

Kolossos Rodou
Browning signed with Kolossos Rodou B.C. of Greek Basket League (GBL) on July 11, 2018. Browning played in 26 GBL games, starting 17, and averaged 12.5 points, 3.4 rebounds and 2.4 assists per game as Kolossos finished last in the league with a 5–21 record.

Inter Bratislava
Browning signed with Inter Bratislava of the Slovak Extraliga on September 12, 2019.

Ovarense Basquetebol
After originally retiring from professional basketball in 2020, Browning decided to resume his playing career and signed with Ovarense Basquetebol of the Liga Portuguesa de Basquetebol on August 9, 2021.

The Basketball Tournament
Browning joined Herd That, a team composed primarily of Marshall alumni, in The Basketball Tournament 2020. He returned to Herd That for The Basketball Tournament 2021.

Coaching career
Browning retired from professional basketball in 2020 to accept a position as a graduate assistant at Marshall. Browning left Marshall's coaching staff after the 2020–21 after deciding to continue his professional playing career.

References

External links
 Fairmont State Fighting Falcons bio
 Marshall Thundering Herd bio
 RealGM.com Profile
 EuroBasket Profile

1993 births
Living people
American expatriate basketball people in Hungary
American expatriate basketball people in Greece
American expatriate basketball people in Slovakia
American expatriate basketball people in Turkey
American men's basketball players
Basketball players from West Virginia
BK Inter Bratislava players
Fairmont State Fighting Falcons men's basketball players
Kolossos Rodou B.C. players
Marshall Thundering Herd men's basketball players
People from Logan, West Virginia
Szolnoki Olaj KK players
Trabzonspor B.K. players
Point guards